Aziz Ahmed HPk (24 June 1906 – 23 October 1982) was a career Pakistani statesman and a diplomat during the Cold War, serving in the capacity as 12th Foreign Minister of Pakistan from 1973 until 1977. Prior to that, Ahmad served as the Pakistan Ambassador to the United States (1959–63) and eventually appointed as Foreign secretary (1960–67) by President Ayub Khan.

He initially gained national prominence when he served as the Foreign secretary under then-Foreign Minister Zulfikar Ali Bhutto and opted for retirement in the opposition of Tashkent Agreement, signed by Ayub Khan to maintain and hold ceasefire with India in 1965. After the general elections in 1970 and the subsequent war with India in 1971, Ahmad was appointed as the Foreign minister of Pakistan until being terminated by President Muhammad Zia-ul-Haq after issuing criticism against the military coup d'état in 1977. Upon retirement from the Foreign Service, Ahmed lived a quiet life in Islamabad and died in 1982.

Early life and education
Aziz Ahmed was born in a Sheikh Qureshi family of Tarn Taran district of Amritsar, British Indian Empire on 24 June 1906. Ahmed received his basic education at Amritsar and moved to Lahore for his further studies and permanently settled there. There, he attended the Government College in 1924, and graduated with a BSc in political science in 1928. He then proceeded to United Kingdom for higher studies, where with a scholarship offered and awarded by the British government, Ahmed subsequently studied at the University of Cambridge in 1929. In 1933, Aziz gained MSc in political science, followed by another MSc in foreign policy. Upon his return Ahmed passed the civil service exam and was commissioned into Indian Civil Service.

Career as civil servant
Aziz Ahmed was a senior member of the Indian Civil Service (ICS) and later Civil Service of Pakistan (CSP). In 1948, Ahmed served in East Bengal prior to independence in 1947 and was instrumental in getting the Debt Alleviation Act of 1938 passed into legislation. Aziz Ahmed subsequently held several senior positions in successive administrations in newly independent Pakistan. He was appointed as the first Chief Secretary of East-Pakistan at a time when General Muhammad Ayub Khan was the General Officer Commanding for East Pakistan. The two developed a close friendship and when Ayub Khan declared martial law and assumed full powers in 1958, Aziz Ahmed was made the highest ranking civil servant in his government as Secretary General, Cabinet Division and Deputy Martial Law Administrator. Aziz Ahmed's tenure as Chief Secretary was marred by allegations of discrimination against the local population, his heavy handed demeanor and colonial style management style. Many have attributed Aziz Ahmed's attitude to the beginning of the long list of grievances that former East Pakistan populace had against the Pakistani establishment.

Subsequently he was sent as Pakistan Ambassador to the United States in 1959 and was instrumental in developing the strong ties between the two countries, that characterised both the Eisenhower and the Kennedy administrations of the early sixties. He returned in 1963 to take up the post of Foreign Secretary at a time when Zulfikar Ali Bhutto was the Foreign Minister. He gained further prominence at the national level in Pakistan, following the 1965 war with India. He was opposed to the signing of the Tashkent Declaration by Ayub Khan as was Bhutto. He retired from government service in 1966 and was assigned to head the National Press Trust.

Indo-Pakistan war of 1965

Ahmed initially gained public prominence with Zulfikar Ali Bhutto in 1965. On 4 September 1965, following skirmishes, Ahmed received a warning from the Pakistan Embassy to Turkey, that the Indian Army was preparing and planning an attack on West-Pakistan. The Pakistani Government decided to launch a counter-attack.

Aziz and Bhutto played an important role in drafting Operation Gibraltar, and along with Bhutto, Aziz Ahmed pressed the Government to take advantage of the disturbed situation in the valley and direct the Army to send raiders into Indian held Kashmir for conducting guerrilla activities. Operation Gibraltar was designed to help local Kashmiris to organise a movement of agitation, the objective being to eventually start an uprising against the occupying power. Throughout this war, Ahmed assisted Bhutto on numerous occasions thereby gaining Bhutto's confidence. From there onwards Bhutto and Aziz Ahmed became good friends. During this war, Morrice James, a senior British diplomat and British High commissioner to Pakistan from 1962–65, convinced Ayub Khan to accept the cease-fire appeal from India, on the basis that Pakistan may not be able fight without weapons or sustain a long war. At the UNSC, Aziz joined Bhutto, when the latter famously announced that, "Pakistan will fight, fight for a thousand years", in reference to the war of 1971".

Aziz and Bhutto disagreed with Ayub Khan's decision to enter into a cease-fire with India in 1965, though the pair did assist Ayub in signing the Tashkent Agreement with India under the auspicious of Soviet Union. Soon after this agreement, Aziz Ahmed took the retirement from the Foreign Service and expressed a strong opposition against the government of Ayub Khan.

Foreign Minister
Soon after the East-Pakistan disaster, followed by the 1971 Winter war, Bhutto was hastily made President on 20 December 1971. After he was appointed President, Zulfikar Ali Bhutto summoned Aziz Ahmed out of retirement and appointed him Minister of State for Foreign Affairs. Subsequently, Aziz Ahmed was regarded as one of Bhutto's closest confidantes and appointed Minister of State for Defence and Foreign Affairs and finally as Foreign Minister for a few months, before the government was toppled in the military coup of 1977. Aziz Ahmed assisted in negotiating the Simla Agreement between Pakistan and India in 1972 and in organising the Islamic Summit at Lahore in 1974, where he headed Pakistan's delegation. As Minister of Defence, he played a key role in re-building Pakistan's defence capability after the 1971 war with India, as well as, the development of the Country's nuclear programme. Aziz convinced Richard Nixon to ensure the supply of weapons to Pakistan to counter Indian hegemony and weapons build-up.

Aziz Ahmed continued to work with Bhutto in building ties with China, and the Arab world. He also helped Bhutto to negotiate with Soviet Union for economical assistance. His term as Foreign Minister was cut short in 1977

Aziz Ahmed remained a staunch opponent of martial law and the military government of General Zia-ul-Haq.

Death and legacy
Aziz Ahmed died on 23 October 1982, aged 76 and was buried in Karachi.  He was a recipient of Pakistan's highest civil award, HPk. He was survived by his wife Shereen Ahmed, two sons and two daughters.

See also
 Muhammad Ayub Khan
 Zulfikar Ali Bhutto
 Pakistan Ambassador to the United States

References

|-

|-

|-

1906 births
1982 deaths
Alumni of the University of Cambridge
Government College University, Lahore alumni
Indian Civil Service (British India) officers
Pakistani civil servants
Foreign Ministers of Pakistan
Foreign Secretaries of Pakistan
Ambassadors of Pakistan to the United States